Sean Duggan may refer to:

 Seánie Duggan (1922–2013), Irish hurler
 Sean Duggan (American football) (born 1993), American football coach